The FAI Cup 1931/32 was the eleventh edition of Ireland's premier cup competition, The Football Association of Ireland Challenge Cup or FAI Cup. The tournament began on 27 December 1931 and concluded on 17 April 1932 with the final held at Dalymount Park, Dublin. An official attendance of 32,000 people watched Shamrock Rovers claim the fourth of five FAI Cup titles in a row by defeating Dolphin.

First round

Second round

Semi-finals

Final

Notes
A.  From 1923 to 1936, the FAI Cup was known as the Free State Cup.

B.  Attendances were calculated using gate receipts which limited their accuracy as a large proportion of people, particularly children, attended football matches in Ireland throughout the 20th century for free by a number of means.

References
General

External links
FAI Website

1931-32
1931–32 in Irish association football
FAI Cup